Chapter I of the Constitution of Australia establishes the Parliament of Australia and its role as the legislative branch of the Government of Australia. The chapter consists of 60 sections which are organised into 5 parts.

Part I: General
Part I contains 6 sections:
Section 1: Legislative power
Section 2: Governor-General
Section 3: Salary of Governor-General
Section 4: Provisions relating to Governor-General
Section 5: Sessions of Parliament. Prorogation and dissolution
Section 6: Yearly session of Parliament

Part II: The Senate
Part II contains 17 sections:
Section 7: The Senate
Section 8: Qualification of electors
Section 9: Method of election of senators in the senate
Section 10: Application of State laws
Section 11: Failure to choose senators
Section 12: Issue of writs
Section 13: Rotation of senators
Section 14: Further provision for rotation
Section 15: Casual vacancies
Section 16: Qualifications of senator
Section 17: Election of President
Section 18: Absence of President
Section 19: Resignation of senator
Section 20: Vacancy by absence
Section 21: Vacancy to be notified
Section 22: Quorum
Section 23: Voting in the Senate

Part III: The House of Representatives
Part III contains 17 sections:
Section 24: Constitution of House of Representatives in Australia
Section 25: Provision as to races disqualified from voting
Section 26: Representatives in first Parliament
Section 27: Alteration of number of members
Section 28: Duration of House of Representatives
Section 29: Electoral divisions
Section 30: Qualification of electors
Section 31: Application of State laws
Section 32: Writs for general election
Section 33: Writs for vacancies
Section 34: Qualifications of members
Section 35: Election of Speaker
Section 36: Absence of Speaker
Section 37: Resignation of member
Section 38: Vacancy by absence
Section 39: Quorum
Section 40: Voting in House of Representatives

Part IV: Both Houses of the Parliament
Part IV consists of 10 sections:
Section 41: Right of electors of States
Section 42: Oath or affirmation of allegiance
Section 43: Member of one House ineligible for other
Section 44: Disqualification
Section 45: Vacancy on happening of disqualification
Section 46: Penalty for sitting when disqualified
Section 47: Disputed elections
Section 48: Allowance to members
Section 49: Privileges etc. of Houses
Section 50: Rules and orders

Part V: Powers of the Parliament in Australia
Part V consists of 10 sections:
Section 51: Legislative powers of the Parliament
Section 52: Exclusive powers of the Parliament
Section 53: Powers of the Houses in respect of legislation
Section 54: Appropriation Bills
Section 55: Tax Bill
Section 56: Recommendation of money votes
Section 57: Disagreement between the Houses
Section 58: Royal assent to Bills
Section 59: Disallowance by the Queen
Section 60: Signification of Queen's pleasure on Bills reserved

References

External links
Commonwealth of Australia Constitution Act: Chapter I - The Parliament

Australian constitutional law